The Polikarpov VIT-1 (— Flying Tank Destroyer) was a Soviet twin-engined multi-purpose aircraft developed before World War II. One prototype was built in 1937, with an extremely heavy armament for ground attack duties. That was the only example built as it was decided to revise the design with more powerful engines as the VIT-2.

Development
The Polikarpov design bureau (OKB) was ordered, in 1936, to begin development of a fast twin-engined aircraft that could be used for ground attack duties and as a heavy fighter. It delivered the ground attack version the following year for evaluation, although it could be modified as necessary for other roles. The VIT-1 was reasonably successful, but it was decided to give it more powerful engines and modify its structure. The improved aircraft was designated as the VIT-2.

The VIT-1 was a low-winged, twin-engined aircraft with a mixed structure. The monocoque fuselage was made in halves of 'shpon', molded birch plywood. The wing and tail structures were built from a mix of steel tubes and duralumin with a duralumin skin. The VIT-1 had the first metal-skinned control surfaces in the USSR. The main legs of the conventional landing gear retracted aft into the engine nacelles, but the tailwheel was fixed. The nose was extensively glazed to give the bombardier/navigator good visibility and he was armed with a  ShVAK cannon with 10° of vertical travel. The rear gunner/radio operator sat behind the pilot in a manually operated turret armed with a  ShKAS machine gun. Two  Shpitalnyi Sh-37 cannon were mounted in the wing roots with very prominent barrels. It used a pair of  Klimov M-103 inline engines driving 3-bladed propellers.

Specifications

See also

References

Notes

Bibliography
 Gordon, Yefim. Soviet Airpower in World War 2. Hinckley, England: Midland Publishing, 2008 
 Gunston, Bill. The Osprey Encyclopaedia of Russian Aircraft 1875–1995. London, Osprey, 1995

External links
VIT-1, SVB, MPI-1 by N.N.Polikarpov 

VIT-1
1930s Soviet attack aircraft
Abandoned military aircraft projects of the Soviet Union